CART: Flag to Flag, known as  in Japan, is a racing video game developed by ZOOM Inc. and published by Sega for the Dreamcast console.

Gameplay
Flag to Flag is licensed by the Championship Auto Racing Teams (CART) racing league. It is based on the 1998 CART FedEx Championship Series. The game contains the 19 race tracks, 27 drivers, and 18 teams that were used in the 1998 CART Season.

Tracks

Reception

The game received "mixed" reviews according to the review aggregation website GameRankings. Jeff Lundrigan of NextGen called it "A competent CART title, but nothing beyond what you'd expect." In Japan, Famitsu gave it a score of 27 out of 40.

References

External links
 

1999 video games
Champ Car video games
Dreamcast games
Dreamcast-only games
Multiplayer and single-player video games
Racing video games
Sega video games
Zoom (video game company) games
Video games developed in Japan